Events in the year 1886 in Norway.

Incumbents
Monarch: Oscar II
Prime Minister: Johan Sverdrup

Events

 The Norwegian Medical Association is established.

Arts and literature
Albertine, novel by Christian Krohg
Mannfolk, novel by Arne Garborg

Notable births
2 January - Elise Ottesen-Jensen, sex educator, journalist and anarchist agitator (died 1973)
6 January - Hans Oskar Evju, politician (died 1967)
11 January – Johannes Lid, botanist (died (1971)).
23 January – Halvard Olsen, politician and trade unionist (died 1966).
18 February – Trygve Bøyesen, gymnast and Olympic silver medallist (died 1963)
20 February – Jørgen Andersen, gymnast and Olympic silver medallist (died 1973)
22 February – Nils Voss, gymnast and Olympic gold medallist (died 1974)
3 March – Tore Ørjasæter, poet (died 1968)
4 March – Ola Solberg, newspaper editor and politician (died 1977)
16 March – Sigurd Smebye, gymnast and Olympic bronze medallist (died 1954)
22 March – Arthur Amundsen, gymnast and Olympic silver medallist (died 1936)
4 April – Jens Marcus Mottré, politician (died 1966)
19 April – Olaf Sletten, shooter and Olympic silver medallist (died 1943)
24 May – Nils Emaus Nilsen, politician (died 1976)
12 June – Jacob Prytz, goldsmith and designer (died 1962).
24 June – Ragnhild Hartmann Varmbo, politician (died 1982)
20 July – Thor Larsen, gymnast and Olympic silver medallist
10 August – Svein Olsen Øraker, politician (died 1963)
18 September – Paul Pedersen, gymnast and Olympic silver medallist (died 1948)
3 November – Hans Næss, sailor and Olympic gold medallist (died 1958)
3 November – Henrik Nielsen, gymnast and Olympic silver medallist (died 1973)
4 November – Theodor Dahl, journalist and fiction writer (d. 1946).
14 November – Marius Nygaard Smith-Petersen, Norwegian American physician and orthopaedic surgeon (died 1953)
25 November – Jens Bull, jurist and diplomat (died 1956)
1 December – Magnus Johansen, politician (died 1970)
8 December – Ole Konrad Ribsskog, politician (died 1941)
9 December – Marius Eriksen, gymnast and Olympic bronze medallist (died 1950)
17 December – Einar Osland, politician (died 1955)

Full date unknown
Bjarne Eriksen, businessman (died 1976)
Thorstein John Ohnstad Fretheim, politician (died 1971)
Ingar Nielsen, sailor and Olympic gold medallist
Ferdinand Schjelderup, mountaineer, Supreme Court Justice and resistance member (died 1955)
Henny Skjønberg, actress and stage director (died 1973)
Olav Martinus Knutsen Steinnes, politician and Minister (died 1961)

Notable deaths

3 January – Andreas Grimelund, bishop (born 1812)
20 February – Ludwig Andreas Olsen, United States Navy sailor awarded two Medals of Honor (born 1845)
2 April – Christian Halvorsen Svenkerud, politician (born 1798)
27 May – Tellef Dahll Schweigaard, politician (born 1806)
15 August – Jens Amundsen, ship-owner (born 1820)
12 September – Johannes Henrik Berg, politician (born 1797)
4 October – Thomas Johannessen Heftye, businessperson, politician and philanthropist (born 1822)
4 November – Ole C. Johnson, soldier in the American Civil War (born 1838)
28 December – Peder Sather, banker and philanthropist (born 1810)

Full date unknown
Søren Jørgensen Aandahl, politician (born 1802)

See also

References

Norway